Stuart Young (born 16 December 1972, in Hull, Yorkshire) is an English footballer.

Career
Young's senior football career began at Arsenal FC in 1990, before moving to his home town of Hull City in 1991. He spent two seasons at the Tigers, before spells at Northampton Town in 1993, Scarborough FC 1994, Scunthorpe United between 1994 and 1996, before joining Blyth Spartans. Young then headed overseas to Singapore where he had three successful seasons. He joined S League side Woodlands Wellington from 1996 to 1997. In his last season in Singapore, he finished as the league's top goal scorer with Home United FC.

In 1999, he rejoined Woodlands Wellington before joining Australian team Wollongong Wolves in the old NSL the same year. The move proved to be a successful one for the striker and he enjoyed five special years in NSW, captaining the side from 2002–04 and winning two NSL Championships along the way. He is the Wollongong Wolves' highest ever goal scorer with 60 goals.

His move to the Perth Glory for the inaugural A-league season endured some early hiccups due to the club's then manager Steve McMahon's reluctance to play the veteran striker. It was suggested that McMahon's apathy towards him resulted from the fact that Young was not one of his signings. During the couple of occasions in which he was used by McMahon, he was substituted on late during the game and this was also indicative of McMahon's belief that his usefulness to the team was limited.

During the 2005 season, Young was offered a trial by Queensland Roar FC who sensed that he had been shut out at Glory, but this did not result in a position in the playing squad. However, newly appointed Glory manager, Ron Smith, had taken a far more positive outlook on Young's services, and this had resulted in increased playing time, and scored the winner in his first game under Smith.

After playing he became manager of Mandurah City in the WA State league in 2009 and left in 2011

References

1972 births
A-League Men players
Living people
Footballers from Kingston upon Hull
English footballers
Arsenal F.C. players
Hull City A.F.C. players
Northampton Town F.C. players
Perth Glory FC players
Scarborough F.C. players
Scunthorpe United F.C. players
Sportspeople from Wollongong
English Football League players
Home United FC players
Expatriate soccer players in Australia
Expatriate footballers in Singapore
Woodlands Wellington FC players
Singapore Premier League players
English emigrants to Australia
Association football forwards